Babar Pur is a census town in North East district in the state of Delhi, India.

Demographics
 India census, Babar Pur had a population of 43,364. Males constitute 54% of the population and females 46%. Babar Pur has an average literacy rate of 66%, higher than the national average of 59.5%; with 59% of the males and 41% of females literate. 16% of the population is under 6 years of age.

References

Cities and towns in North East Delhi district